= Solangi Kharal =

Village in Punjab, Pakistan

Solangi Kharal is a village of central Punjab in Pakistan. It is situated on the main highway from Gujranwala to Sargodha. Solangi Kharal obtained the status of Union council in 2016 local elections chairman of Solangi Kharal is Muhammad Shaukat kharal.

Solangi Kharal is most populous and most modern village of Hafizabad District. It is an industrial village having two main industries of rice and jute and two small mills of rice.It has a population of 4,800, with 2,243 registered to vote.
